George McNestry (7 January 1908 – March 1998) was a professional footballer who played as an outside forward in The Football League for seven different teams between 1926 and 1937. He is the only player to have won the Division Three (South) Cup in two successive seasons, winning it with Bristol Rovers in 1935 and Coventry City in 1936.

McNestry, who was born in Chopwell, County Durham, started his footballing career playing for his home town club Chopwell Institute. In 1926 he had an unsuccessful trial with Arsenal and in August that year joined Bradford Park Avenue, with whom he made his Football League debut. He failed to settle with a club early in his career, only staying for a single season with Bradford and each of his next three clubs; Doncaster Rovers, Leeds United, and Sunderland.

After joining Luton Town in 1930, McNestry finally became a first team regular and scored 26 times in 69 League games during a two-year stay. He joined Bristol Rovers in 1932 and stayed there for three years, playing 113 games and scoring 42 goals, before moving to Coventry City for two years from 1935.

Sources

1908 births
1998 deaths
People from County Durham (before 1974)
Footballers from Tyne and Wear
English footballers
Association football forwards
English Football League players
Bradford (Park Avenue) A.F.C. players
Doncaster Rovers F.C. players
Leeds United F.C. players
Sunderland A.F.C. players
Luton Town F.C. players
Bristol Rovers F.C. players
Coventry City F.C. players